Martin Thomas (born 15 September 1989) is a French slalom canoeist who has competed at the international level since 2010.

He won two medals in the C1 team event at the ICF Canoe Slalom World Championships with a gold in 2021 and a silver in 2017. He also won two silver medals at the 2019 European Canoe Slalom Championships in Pau (C1 and C1 team events).

Thomas competed in the C1 event at the 2020 Summer Olympics, finishing in 5th place.

World Cup individual podiums

References

External links

French male canoeists
Living people
Medalists at the ICF Canoe Slalom World Championships
Olympic canoeists of France
Canoeists at the 2020 Summer Olympics
1989 births